The scruple (℈) is a small unit in the apothecaries' system, derived from the old Roman  unit (scrupulus/scrupulum).

Mass unit
The scruple is  ounce,  dram, or 20 grains. It is therefore equal to 1.2959782 grams. The Roman scruple was somewhat smaller, around 1.14 g.

Volume unit
The fluid scruple is  fluid ounce,  fluid dram, 20 minims, or  teaspoon, or 1 saltspoon. It is therefore equal to 1.23 milliliters.

See also
 Scruples (disambiguation)
 Roman units
 Byzantine units
 Э

References

Units of volume
Customary units of measurement
Alcohol measurement
spoons
Cooking weights and measures
Units of mass